Four Days Away is the fourth studio album released by the American singler, songwriter John Mark Nelson on July 13, 2017.

Background
On September 11, 2015 Nelson released its third studio album I'm Not Afraid. After this was released he started to write and compose some songs for his upcoming album. Nelson stated that he started writing the album, but the process took longer and he didn't seem to find a way to finish the record, so he decided on starting the process from the scratch. On May 29, 2017 he left for Everwood Farmstead at Glenwood City, WI and started recording the new album ending the process on July 2. Four Days Away carries the concept of the album recorded on four days. He stated about the album production, "Each song was recorded using just two microphones, a few instruments, a Princeton amp, and was mixed using only EQ and compression.".

The album was released by Nelson on Bandcamp for free download.

Track listing

Personnel
John Mark Nelson – vocals, songwriting, guitar, co-producer
Huntley Miller – Audio mastering
Sarah Nelson – cover art
 Lisa Albinson – design

Notes

2017 albums
John Mark Nelson albums